The 2021–22 Metal Ligaen season was the 65th season of the Metal Ligaen, the top level of ice hockey in Denmark. Nine teams participated in the league.

Teams 

Teams licensed to play in the Metal Ligaen 2021–22

Regular season

Results

Play-offs

Bracket

Quarterfinals

Semifinals

Third place

Finals

Final rankings

References

External links 
 Metal Ligaen official website
 Results - Metal Ligaen 2021-2022
 Metal Ligaen on eurohockey.com
 Metal Ligaen on eliteprospects.com
 Season on hockeyarchives.info 

2021 in Danish sport
2022 in Danish sport
2021–22 in European ice hockey leagues
Seasons in Superisligaen